Carefree is the first full-length album by Los Angeles based Devon Williams since disbanding Fingers Cut Megamachine.

Track listing
 "Please Be Patient" – 2:45
 "Honey" – 2:07
 "Elevator" – 3:18
 "Fragile Weapon" – 2:30
 "Stephane City" – 2:52
 "One and One" – 2:43
 "A Truce" – 3:26
 "Jolie" – 2:48
 "Bells" – 1:24
 "How Could I Not" – 5:52
 "A Day in the Night" – 4:57

Notes/trivia
 The entire length of track 11, "A Day in the Night", is 16:03, and includes a secret track at 14:55.
 The album is titled Carefree on the front cover, and Careerfree on the spines.
 Track 9, "Bells", was previously titled "Slaughter House".

2008 albums